This is a list of the described species of the harvestman family Epedanidae. The data is taken from Joel Hallan's Biology Catalog.

Dibuninae
 Dibuninae Roewer, 1912
 Dibunus Loman, 1906
 Dibunus albitarsus (Roewer, 1927) — Philippines
 Dibunus chapmani (Roewer, 1927) — Philippines
 Dibunus dividuus Suzuki, 1977
 Dibunus gracile (Roewer, 1912) — Philippines
 Dibunus longipalpis Roewer, 1912 — Philippines
 Dibunus maculatipes (Roewer, 1915) — Maluku Islands
 Dibunus marianae Goodnight & Goodnight, 1957
 Dibunus pseudobiantes Loman, 1906 — New Guinea
 Dibunus similis Roewer, 1912 — Philippines
 Dibunus transitorius (Roewer, 1927) — Philippines

Epedaninae
 Epedaninae Sørensen, in L.Koch 1886
 Alloepedanus S. Suzuki, 1985
 Alloepedanus robustus S. Suzuki, 1985 — Thailand

 Balabanus Suzuki, 1977
 Balabanus quadrispinosus Suzuki, 1977

 Caletorellus Roewer, 1938
 Caletorellus siamensis (Hirst, 1912) — Thailand

 Epedanellus Roewer, 1911
 Epedanellus tuberculatus Roewer, 1911 — Japan

 Epedanidus Roewer, 1945
 Epedanidus globibunus Roewer, 1945 — Perak

 Epedanulus Roewer, 1913
 Epedanulus sarasinorum Roewer, 1913 — Sulawesi

 Epedanus Thorell, 1876
 Epedanus brevipalpus Banks, 1931 — Borneo
 Epedanus cavicolus Banks, 1931 — Borneo
 Epedanus javanus Thorell, 1876 — Java
 Epedanus lutescens Thorell, 1876 — Sarawak
 Epedanus pictus Thorell, 1876 — Sarawak
 Epedanus pinangensis Thorell, 1890 — Pinang
 Epedanus praedo Sørensen, 1932 — Borneo
 Epedanus sumbawanus (Roewer, 1938) — Sumbawa

 Euepedanus Roewer, 1915
 Euepedanus chaiensis Suzuki, 1970
 Euepedanus dividuus Suzuki, 1970
 Euepedanus orientalis (Hirst, 1912) — Thailand
 Euepedanus pentaspinulatus S. Suzuki, 1985 — Thailand
 Euepedanus similis S. Suzuki, 1985 — Thailand
 Euepedanus spinosus S. Suzuki, 1985 — Thailand
 Euepedanus trispinosus Roewer, 1915 — Malacca

 Funkikoa Roewer, 1927
 Funkikoa maxima Roewer, 1927 — Funkiko (Taiwan)

 Heteroepedanus Roewer, 1912
 Heteroepedanus monacantha (Roewer, 1911)
 Heteroepedanus tricantha (Roewer, 1911)

 Aboriscus Roewer, 1940
 Aboriscus singularis (Roewer, 1912) — India, Malaysia
 Aboriscus longipes (Roewer, 1913) — India
 Aboriscus aborensis (Roewer, 1913) — India

 Lobonychium Roewer, 1938
 Lobonychium palpiplus Roewer, 1938 — Borneo

 Metathyreotus Roewer, 1913
 Metathyreotus aborensis Roewer, 1913 — Assam
 Metathyreotus kempi Roewer, 1913 — Assam

 Metepedanulus Roewer, 1913
 Metepedanulus sarasinorum Roewer, 1913 — Sulawesi
 Metepedanulus flaveolus Banks, 1931 — Borneo

 Metepedanus Roewer, 1912
 Metepedanus venator (Roewer, 1911) — Borneo
 Metepedanus accentuatus (Roewer, 1911) — Borneo

 Mosfora Roewer, 1938
 Mosfora silvestrii (Roewer, 1925) — Funkiko

 Nanepedanus Roewer, 1938
 Nanepedanus rufus Roewer, 1938 — Borneo

 Neoepedanus Roewer, 1912
 Neoepedanus fokiensis Roewer, 1912 — China

 Paratakaoia S. Suzuki, 1985 — Thailand
 Paratakaoia parva S. Suzuki, 1985
 Paratakaoia minima (Suzuki, 1986) — Thailand

 Parepedanulus Roewer, 1913
 Parepedanulus sarasinorum Roewer, 1913 — Sulawesi
 Parepedanulus bicmaculatus Roewer, 1915

 Plistobunus Pocock, 1903
 Plistobunus rapax Pocock, 1903 — Hong Kong

 Pseudoepedanus Suzuki, 1969
 Pseudoepedanus dolensis Suzuki, 1970

 Pseudomarthana P. D. Hillyard, 1985
 Pseudomarthana conspicua P. D. Hillyard, 1985 — Malaysia

 Takaoia Roewer, 1911 — Takoia? (Solomon Islands)
 Takaoia kubotai S. Suzuki, 1982 — Malaysia
 Takaoia sauteri Roewer, 1911 — Taiwan
 Takaoia similis Roewer, 1915 — Taiwan

 Thyreotus Thorell, 1889
 Thyreotus bifasciatus Thorell, 1889 — Burma
 Thyreotus bimaculatus Roewer, 1912 — Burma

 Toccolus Roewer, 1927
 Toccolus minimus Roewer, 1927 — Tonking
 Toccolus chibai Suzuki, 1976
 Toccolus globitarsis Suzuki, 1970

 Zepedanulus Roewer, 1927
 Zepedanulus armatipalpus Roewer, 1927 — Malacca
 Zepedanulus alter Roewer, 1963
 Zepedanulus ishikawai Suzuki, 1971
 Zepedanulus watanabei S. Suzuki, 1981 — Thailand

Acrobuninae
 Acrobuninae Roewer, 1912
 Acrobunus Thorell, 1891
 Acrobunus nigropunctatus Thorell, 1891 — Sumatra
 Acrobunus bifasciatus Thorell, 1911 — Sumatra
 Acrobunus thorelli Banks, 1931 — Borneo

 Anacrobunus Roewer, 1927
 Anacrobunus filipes Roewer, 1927 — Riau Islands

 Harpagonellus Roewer, 1927
 Harpagonellus glaber Roewer, 1927 — Sumatra

 Heterobiantes Roewer, 1912
 Heterobiantes geniculatus (Pocock, 1903) — Hong Kong

 Metacrobunus Roewer, 1915
 Metacrobunus macrochelis Roewer, 1915 — Malacca
 Metacrobunus frontalis Banks, 1931 — Borneo

 Paracrobunus Suzuki, 1977
 Paracrobunus bimaculatus Suzuki, 1977
 Paracrobunus similis Suzuki, 1982

Sarasinicinae
 Sarasinicinae Roewer, 1923 — should possibly be a family
 Acanthepedanus Roewer, 1912
 Acanthepedanus armatus Roewer, 1912 — Sumatra

 Albertops Roewer, 1938
 Albertops robustus Roewer, 1938 — Borneo

 Asopella Sørensen, 1932
 Asopella robusta S. Suzuki, 1982 — Philippines
 Asopella xanti Sørensen, 1932 — Java

 Delicola Roewer, 1938
 Delicola longipalpis Roewer, 1938 — Sumatra

 Gintingius Roewer, 1938
 Gintingius robustus Roewer, 1938 — Pahang

 Kilungius Roewer, 1915
 Kilungius bimaculatus Roewer, 1915 — Taiwan
 Kilungius insulanus (Hirst, 1911) — Japan?

 Koyanus Roewer, 1938
 Koyanus clarus Roewer, 1938 — Borneo

 Kuchingius Roewer, 1927
 Kuchingius megalopalpus Roewer, 1927 — Borneo

 Nobeoka Roewer, 1938 —  Japan
 Nobeoka laevis Roewer, 1938

 Opelytus Roewer, 1927
 Opelytus rugichelis Roewer, 1938 — Borneo
 Opelytus simoni Roewer, 1927 — Malacca
 Opelytus spinichelis Rower, 1938 — Tenasserim
 Opelytus vepretum Roewer, 1927 — Pulu Pinang

 Padangcola Roewer, 1963 — should possibly be in Epedaninae
 Padangcola jacobsoni Roewer, 1963

 Panticola Roewer, 1938 — placement is uncertain
 Panticola elegans Roewer, 1938 — Malacca

 Parepedanus Roewer, 1912
 Parepedanus bispinosus Roewer, 1912 — Sumatra
 Parepedanus bimaculatus Roewer, 1915 — Malacca

 Pasohnus Suzuki, 1976 — was in Phalangodidae
 Pasohnus bispinosus Suzuki, 1976

 Pseudobiantes Hirst, 1911 — Japan
 Pseudobiantes japonicus Hirst, 1911 — Japan
 Pseudobiantes silvestrii (Mello-Leitão, 1944) — nomen novum for P. japonicus

 Punanus Roewer, 1938
 Punanus tenuis Roewer, 1938 — Borneo

 Sarasinica Strand, 1914
 Sarasinica atra Roewer, 1938 — Borneo
 Sarasinica femoralis Roewer, 1938 — Borneo
 Sarasinica tricommata (Roewer, 1913) — Sulawesi
 Sarasinica tricommata tricommata (Roewer, 1913)
 Sarasinica tricommata quadripunctata Roewer, 1913
 Sarasinica tricommata sexpunctata Roewer, 1913
 Sarasinica henrikseni Mello-Leitão, 1944

 Sembilanus Roewer, 1938
 Sembilanus rugichelis Roewer, 1938 — Malacca

 Sinistus Roewer, 1938
 Sinistus maculatus Roewer, 1938 — Borneo
 Sinistus fuscus Roewer, 1938 — Borneo

 Siponnus Roewer, 1927
 Siponnus stimulatus Roewer, 1927 — Pulu Pinang

 Sungsotia Tsurusaki, 1995
 Sungsotia uenoi Tsurusaki, 1995 — Vietnam

 Tegestria Roewer, 1936
 Tegestria borneensis Roewer, 1938 — Borneo
 Tegestria coniata Roewer, 1938 — Malacca
 Tegestria johorea Roewer, 1936 — Malacca
 Tegestria montana Roewer, 1938 — Pulu Pinang
 Tegestria parva Suzuki, 1970
 Tegestria pinangensis see Roewer 1938
 Tegestria seriata Roewer, 1938 — Malacca
 Tegestria sumatrana Roewer, 1938 — Sumatra

 Tonkinatus Roewer, 1938 — Tonking
 Tonkinatus bimaculatus Roewer, 1938

Incertae sedis
 Incertae sedis
 Beloniscellus Roewer, 1912
 Beloniscellus lombokiensis (Roewer, 1912) — Lombok
 Beloniscellus floresianus Roewer, 1931 — Sunda Islands
 Beloniscellus renschi Roewer, 1931 — Sunda Islands
 Beloniscellus sumbawaensis Roewer, 1931 — Sunda Islands
 Beloniscellus parvicalcar Roewer, 1931 — Sunda Islands
 Beloniscellus narmadeus Roewer, 1949 — Indonesia

 Beloniscops Roewer, 1949
 Beloniscops flavicalcar Roewer, 1949 — Sumatra
 Beloniscops lata Roewer, 1949 — Sumatra

 Belonisculus Roewer, 1923
 Belonisculus jacobsoni Roewer, 1923 — Simalur Island (Sumatra)

 Beloniscus Thorell, 1891
 Beloniscus albimarginatus Roewer, 1915 — Singapore
 Beloniscus albiephippiatus Roewer, 1916 — Singapore
 Beloniscus albipustulatus Roewer, 1949 — Sumatra
 Beloniscus biconus Roewer, 1926 — Sumatra
 Beloniscus bicornis Roewer, 1927 — Sumatra
 Beloniscus malayanus Roewer, 1949 — Sumatra
 Beloniscus morosus Thorell, 1891 — Sumatra
 Beloniscus ochraceus Loman, in Weber 1892 — Sumatra
 Beloniscus pustulosus Loman, in Weber 1892 — Sumatra
 Beloniscus quinquespinosus Thorell, 1891 — Sumatra
 Beloniscus simaluris Roewer, 1923 — Simalur Island
 Beloniscus thienemanni Roewer, 1931 — Sunda Islands
 Beloniscus tricalcaratus Roewer, 1949 — Java
 Beloniscus tuberculatus Roewer, 1927 — Sumatra

 Buparellus Roewer, 1949
 Buparellus mitylus (Thorell, 1889) — Burma
 Buparellus dibunichelis Roewer, 1949 — Burma
 Buparellus patellaris Roewer, 1949 — Burma
 Buparellus insolitus S. Suzuki, 1985 — Thailand

 Bupares Thorell, 1889
 Bupares armatus Roewer, 1949 — Burma
 Bupares caper Thorell, 1889 — India, Burma
 Bupares chelicornis Roewer, 1927 — Thailand
 Bupares degerbolae S. Suzuki, 1985 — Thailand
 Bupares granulatus Thorell, 1890 — Pinang
 Bupares pachytarsus Roewer, 1934 — Perak, Singapore
 Bupares stridulator Roewer, 1949 — Burma
 Bupares trochanteralis Roewer, 1949 — Burma

 Dhaulagirius Martens, 1977 — placement is uncertain
 Dhaulagirius altitudinalis Marten, 1977

 Dumaguetes Roewer, 1927
 Dumaguetes chapmani Roewer, 1927 — Philippines

 Parabeloniscus Suzuki, 1967
 Parabeloniscus caudatus Suzuki, 1973
 Parabeloniscus nipponicus Suzuki, 1967
 Parabeloniscus shimojanai Suzuki, 1971

 Parabupares S. Suzuki, 1982
 Parabupares robustus S. Suzuki, 1982 — Indonesia

 Sotekia S. Suzuki, 1982
 Sotekia minima S. Suzuki, 1982 — Indonesia

 Tithaeus Thorell, 1890
 Tithaeus annandalei Roewer, 1927 — Singapore
 Tithaeus birmanicus Roewer, 1949 — Burma
 Tithaeus borneensis Roewer, 1949 — Borneo
 Tithaeus cruciatus Roewer, 1927 — Sumatra
 Tithaeus drac Lian, Zhu & Kury, 2008 — China
 Tithaeus flavescens Banks, 1931 — Borneo
 Tithaeus fraseri Suzuki, 1972 — Malaysia
 Tithaeus fuscus Roewer, 1949 — Borneo
 Tithaeus granulatus Banks, 1931 — Borneo
 Tithaeus indochinensis Roewer, 1925 — Tonking
 Tithaeus jacobsoni Roewer, 1923 — Sumatra
 Tithaeus javanus Roewer, 1949 — Java
 Tithaeus johorensis Roewer, 1949 — Malaya
 Tithaeus kokutnus S. Suzuki, 1985 — Thailand
 Tithaeus krakatauensis Roewer, 1949 — Indonesia
 Tithaeus laevigatus Thorell, 1890 — Pinang
 Tithaeus lesserti Roewer, 1949 — Borneo
 Tithaeus longipes Banks, 1931 — Borneo
 Tithaeus malakkanus Roewer, 1949 — Staits
 Tithaeus metatarsalis Roewer, 1949 — Malaya
 Tithaeus minor Roewer, 1949 — Singapore
 Tithaeus nigripes Banks, 1931 — Borneo
 Tithaeus pumilio Roewer, 1949 — Sarawak
 Tithaeus rotundus Suzuki, 1970
 Tithaeus rudispina Roewer, 1935 — Malaya
 Tithaeus rudispina Roewer, 1949 — Johore (preoccupied?)
 Tithaeus sarawakensis Roewer, 1912 — Sarawak
 Tithaeus siamensis Roewer, 1949 — Thailand
 Tithaeus similis S. Suzuki, 1985 — Thailand
 Tithaeus tenuis Roewer, 1949 — Johore
 Tithaeus timorensis Roewer, 1949 — Indonesia
 Tithaeus trimaculatus Roewer, 1949 — Indonesia
 Tithaeus vagus (Loman, 1892)
 Tithaeus watanabei Suzuki, 1970b

 Tokunosia Suzuki, 1964
 Tokunosia tenuipes Suzuki, 1964
 Tokunosia tenuipes tenuipes Suzuki, 1964
 Tokunosia tenuipes tuberuculata Suzuki, 1973
 Tokunosia tenuipes taiwana Suzuki, 1977

References
 Joel Hallan's Biology Catalog: Epedanidae
 Lian, W.-G., Zhu, M.-S., & Kury, A.B. (2008). "A new species of the genus Tithaeus from China (Arachnida: Laniatores: Epedanidae)." Zootaxa 1841: 53-60.

Epedanidae
Epedanidae